Felipe de Oliveira Silva (born 28 May 1990), known as Felipe Silva or simply Felipe, is a Brazilian footballer who plays as an attacking midfielder for Inter de Limeira.

Career statistics

References

External links

WebSoccerClub 

1990 births
Living people
People from Piracicaba
Brazilian footballers
Association football midfielders
Campeonato Brasileiro Série A players
Campeonato Brasileiro Série B players
Sociedade Esportiva Palmeiras players
Rio Branco Esporte Clube players
Esporte Clube Bahia players
Olaria Atlético Clube players
Guarani FC players
Mogi Mirim Esporte Clube players
Club Athletico Paranaense players
Figueirense FC players
Associação Atlética Ponte Preta players
Ceará Sporting Club players
Associação Chapecoense de Futebol players
Associação Atlética Internacional (Limeira) players
J1 League players
Sanfrecce Hiroshima players
Brazilian expatriate footballers
Brazilian expatriate sportspeople in Japan
Expatriate footballers in Japan
Footballers from São Paulo (state)